Gulussa was the second legitimate son of Masinissa. Gulussa became the King of Numidia along with his two brothers around 148 BC and reigned as part of a triumvirate for about three years.

Biography 
In 148 BC, Masinissa, feeling that he was near death, consulted with Scipio Aemilianus regarding the settlement of his state. 

Resuscitating, perhaps, a Libyan custom which shared the authority between three persons, Scipio Aemilianus established the three legitimate surviving sons as kings: Micipsa, Gulussa and Mastanabal. The royal power was divided among the three princes. Micipsa, the eldest, was in charge of the administration; it was to him that Masinissa had given his ring which, judging from the stelae of the Abizar style, was a sign of power. Gulussa was given the command of the armies. As for Mastanabal, who was said to have been instructed in Greek, he was charged with justice, and relations with vassal tribal leaders.

War with Carthaginians 
Gulussa already had a solid experience of war. He had the opportunity to prove his worth by fighting the Carthaginians. In the spring of 150 BC, he and Micipsa led an embassy to the Carthaginian authorities. But the Carthaginians, exasperated by the successive annexations of Masinissa, refused to enter into negotiations and even ambushed the princes on their return from Carthage. This action by the Carthaginians gave the Numidians the excuse to resume the fighting and they seized the Carthaginian city of Oroscopa. The fighting then served as a pretext for Rome to intervene in the region. Gulussa and his troops participated in the Battle of Carthage (148 BC).

Later life 
After the settlement of 148 BC, there is no further information on Gulussa or Mastanabal. Nothing is known about the dates of their deaths and the end of the triumviral reign. It can be deduced from the dedication of the temple of Massinissa in Dougga that by 139 BC Micipsa reigned alone over Numidia.

Bibliography

Notes

References

Sources 

 

2nd-century BC rulers in Africa
2nd-century BC Berber people
Foreign relations of ancient Rome
Kings of Numidia